Zinner is a surname. Notable people with the surname include:

 Emil Zinner (1909–1942), Jewish-Czech chess master
 Ernst Zinner (1886–1970), German astronomer
 Ernst K. Zinner (1937–2015), Austrian astrophysicist
 Hedda Zinner (1905–1994), German political writer
 Nick Zinner (born 1974), American guitarist
 Peter Zinner (1919–2007), American filmmaker

See also
Zinner (crater), a lunar crater